John Gerry may refer to:
 John F. Gerry, American judge
 John Joseph Gerry, Roman Catholic bishop